Amplirhagada herbertena is a species of air-breathing land snail, a terrestrial pulmonate gastropod mollusk in the family Camaenidae. This species is endemic to Australia.

References

Gastropods of Australia
herbertena
Gastropods described in 1939
Taxonomy articles created by Polbot